Tong Tekong (23 August 1920 in Anhui province, China - 26 October 2009) was a historian, academic and an author. Tong graduated in Nanjing University majoring in history, and finished his PhD at Columbia University, and later taught Chinese history in Columbia University. Tong also worked as professor in City University of New York for 20 years, and retired in 1991.

Selected works
US Diplomacy in China, 1844-1860 (1964)
The Memoirs of V. K. Wellington Koo (1977)
The Memoirs of Hu Shih (1977)
The Memoirs of Li Tsung-jen (1979)
The Third Americans: A Select Bibliography on Asians in America with Annotations (1980)
An Autobiography: As Told by Hu Shih (1980)
Lectures on American History (1982)
Random Memories of Hu Shih (1985)

References

Columbia University alumni
Nanjing University alumni
Republic of China historians
City University of New York staff
1920 births
2009 deaths
People from Hefei
Columbia University faculty
20th-century American historians
American male non-fiction writers
American writers of Chinese descent
Historians from Anhui
Chinese emigrants to the United States
20th-century American male writers